Captain Charles Antony Lyell, 2nd Baron Lyell, VC, 2nd Bt (14 June 1913 – 27 April 1943) was a British recipient of the Victoria Cross, the highest and most prestigious award for gallantry in the face of the enemy that can be awarded to British and Commonwealth forces.

Background
He was the son of Charles Henry Lyell and his wife Rosalind Margaret Watney. His father died in 1918 and he succeeded his grandfather as Baron Lyell in 1926. He was educated at Eton and matriculated at Christ Church, Oxford in 1932, graduating in 1936.
Both his father and his grandfather, Leonard Lyell were Liberal MPs. Between 1936 and his death, Lord Lyell was a member of Boodle's club in St James's, London. He moved to his family's estate in Kirriemuir, Angus before the war where he was a county councillor.

He married Sophie Mary Trafford on 4 July 1938. They had one son, who became Charles Lyell, 3rd Baron Lyell.

His portrait was painted by James McIntosh Patrick in 1940.

Victoria Cross action
Lyell was 29 years old, and a temporary captain in the 1st Battalion, Scots Guards, British Army during the Second World War when the following deed took place for which he was awarded the VC.

During the period 22–27 April 1943 near Dj Bou Arada, Tunisia, Captain Lord Lyell's outstanding leadership and gallantry enabled his company to take its objective. On 27 April accompanied by a sergeant, a lance-corporal and two guardsmen, he led an attack on an enemy post consisting of an 88mm gun and a heavy machine-gun in two separate pits. He destroyed the crew of the machine-gun with a hand grenade and then, three of the party having become casualties, and with the lance-corporal to give covering fire he leapt into the second pit, killing several of the crew before being overwhelmed and killed. Both the guns had been silenced.  The others involved in the action were: Lance-Sergeant 2698583 James Robertson (killed), Lance-Corporal 2699878 James Ramage Kinghorn Lawrie, Guardsman 2698039 John Chisholm, and Guardsman 2697572 William Porter (died the next day from a head wound). Lance-Corporal Lawrie and Guardsman Chisholm received the Military Medal, whilst Lance-Sergeant Robertson and Guardsman William Porter were mentioned in dispatches by the King.

He is buried in the Massicault War Cemetery, southwest of Tunis.

References

British VCs of World War 2 (John Laffin, 1997)
Monuments to Courage (David Harvey, 1999)
The Register of the Victoria Cross (This England, 1997)
Scotland's Forgotten Valour (Graham Ross, 1995)

1913 births
1943 deaths
People educated at Eton College
People from Chelsea, London
Barons in the Peerage of the United Kingdom
Scots Guards officers
British Army personnel killed in World War II
British World War II recipients of the Victoria Cross
Alumni of Christ Church, Oxford
Councillors in Scotland
British Army recipients of the Victoria Cross
Military personnel from London
Burials in Tunisia